Seumanu Aita Ah Wa (died 23 January 2004) was a Samoan politician and former Cabinet Minister. He was a member of the Human Rights Protection Party.

Seumanu was a businessman. He was first elected to the Legislative Assembly of Samoa at the 1979 election, and was appointed Minister of Agriculture. He lost his seat in the 1985 election. Following the death of former Prime Minister Tofilau Eti Alesana he was re-elected to parliament in the 1999 Fa’asalele’aga No 1 By-election. He was re-elected in 2001 and was appointed Minister of Justice.

Seumanu died of cancer in Auckland, New Zealand where he was receiving medical treatment. He was given a state funeral and buried at his home village of Saleimoa. His death triggered the 2004 Fa’asalele’aga No 1 By-election, which was won by Tiata Sili Pulufana.

References

2004 deaths
Members of the Legislative Assembly of Samoa
Agriculture ministers of Samoa
Justice ministers of Samoa
Human Rights Protection Party politicians